The Wakelon School is a historic school building located in Zebulon, Wake County, North Carolina, a suburb of Raleigh. Wakelon was designed by architect Charles E. Hartge and was built in 1908.  It served as an elementary school until the student population became too large for the facility. GlaxoSmithKline purchased Wakelon School from the Town of Zebulon in 1986 and used the building for office space. In March 2007 voters approved to repurchase Wakelon to be used as the new town hall. Renovations began in early 2008.

It was listed on the National Register of Historic Places in 1976.

See also
 List of Registered Historic Places in North Carolina

References

External links 

 Guide to the "Cassie, We are Going to Lose it All": Remembrances of the Great Depression -- How It Really was on a Tobacco Farm 1987

School buildings on the National Register of Historic Places in North Carolina
School buildings completed in 1908
Defunct schools in North Carolina
Buildings and structures in Wake County, North Carolina
National Register of Historic Places in Wake County, North Carolina
1908 establishments in North Carolina